is a Japanese ice hockey defender.

International career

Yamane was selected for the Japan women's national ice hockey team in the 2014 Winter Olympics. She played in all five games, scoring one goal.

Yamane also played for Japan in the qualifying events for the 2014, 2010 and 2006 Winter Olympics.

As of 2015, Yamane has also appeared for Japan at six IIHF Women's World Championships, with the first in 2001.

Career statistics

International career
Through 2014–15 season

References

External links
Eurohockey.com Profile
Sports-Reference Profile

1987 births
People from Hiroshima Prefecture
Living people
Olympic ice hockey players of Japan
Ice hockey players at the 2014 Winter Olympics
Japanese women's ice hockey defencemen
Asian Games medalists in ice hockey
Ice hockey players at the 2007 Asian Winter Games
Ice hockey players at the 2011 Asian Winter Games
Medalists at the 2007 Asian Winter Games
Medalists at the 2011 Asian Winter Games
Asian Games silver medalists for Japan